Siyahrud Rural District may refer to:

Siyahrud Rural District (Mazandaran Province)
Siyahrud Rural District (Tehran County), Tehran province